The Norrköping Dolphins are a professional basketball club from Norrköping, Sweden. It plays in the Basketligan, the highest league in Sweden and won the league six times. Home games of Norrköping are played at the Stadium Arena.

History
The club was established as Hageby BK on May 8, 1963, by Åke Björck. Its name was taken from the Hageby district in Norrköping.

The men's team made its debut in the Swedish first tier in 1964–65 but were relegated after only one year. They returned eleven years later, in 1976–77, with the American players Fran O'Hanlon and Kenny Grant on the roster.

In 1980, Hageby won its first national championship after defeating Alviks BK in the finals, 3–1.

In 1992 the Swedish basketball league was formed and the club changed its name to Norrköping Dolphins.

Arena 

The Stadium Arena is the home arena of the Dolphins since its opening in December 2008. It holds capacity for 3,500 people.

Trophies
Basketligan 
Winners (7): 1979–80, 1997–98, 2009–10, 2011–12, 2017–18, 2020-21, 2021–22
Runners-up (1): 2015–16

Season by season

Players

Roster

Notable players

Women's team 
The Dolphins also have a women's team playing in the highest Swedish level and have won the championship in 2000, 2013 and 2022. In the 1999–2000 season, they were known as Norrköping Flamingos.

External links
Team profile at eurobasket.com

Basketball teams in Sweden
Basketball teams established in 1963
Sport in Norrköping